Picnic is a Russian rock band known for its unique style which is a mixture of art rock, progressive rock and original Russian rock. The band was formed in 1978 in Leningrad by Sergey Omelnichenko, Evgeny Voloschuk, Aleksey Dobychin and Edmund Shklyarskiy. Piknik is considered to be one of the "classic" Russian rock bands. Originated from the classic rock with huge influence of Jethro Tull and Led Zeppelin, its music progressed into its own style with using symphonic and exotic folk instruments. Also Piknik is considered sometimes to be the first Russian gothic rock band due to its specific sound, stage performances and dark lyrics.

During more than 30 years of its existence the group's lineup changed many times, and the one and only permanent member and leader of the group is the frontman and lyricist Edmund Shklyarskiy.

The name of the group was created as an allusion to the well-known novel Roadside Picnic written in 1971 by Arkady and Boris Strugatsky.

Some of their early songs are written in Polish.

In 2016 the band was barred from performing in Ukraine due to them performing in Crimea after annexation of Crimea by the Russian Federation, because Ukraine, like the UN, considers Crimea to be illegally occupied.

Members

Current members:

 Edmund Shklyarskiy – vocals, guitars, keyboards (1978–1979, 1981 – present)
 Leonid Kirnos – drums, percussion (1982–1984, 1987 – present)
 Marat Korchemny – back vocals, bass (2003 – present)
 Stanislav Shklyarskiy – keyboards (2007 – present), replacing Sergey Voronin, the most long-playing member (1984–2006), who died from heart attack

Former:

 Nikolay Mikhailov (1978–1981)
 Alexander Matskov (1978–1981)
 Ali Bakhtyarov (1981–1983)
 Sergey Omelnichenko (1978–1982)
 Aleksey Dobychin (1978–1983)
 Evgeny Voloschuk (1978–1984)
 Vadim Lebanidze (1979-1982)
 Yury Danilov (1979–1981)
 Victor Morozov (1982–1983)
 Alexander Savelyev (1983–1991)
 Sergey Voronin (1984–2006)
 Vladimir Sizov (1984, 1989)
 Victor Evseev (1985–1988, 1990–1996, 2007)
 Yury Klyuchanzev (1985–1988, 1990–1996)
 Andrey Merchanskiy (1990–1994)
 Alexander Rokin (1996–1999)
 Sviatoslav Obraztsov (1999–2003)

Discography

 Dym (1982) (lit. "Smoke", Rus. "Дым")
 Tanetz Volka (1984) (Wolf's Dance, Танец волка)
 Iyeroglif (1986) (Hieroglyph, Иероглиф)
 Rodom Niotkuda (1988) (Born Nowhere, Родом Ниоткуда)
 Kharakiri (1991) (Харакири)
 Nemnogo Ognya (1994) (A Bit of Fire, Немного Огня)
 Vampirskiye Pesni (1995) (Vampire Songs, Вампирские Песни)
 Zhen-Shen (1996) (Ginseng, Жень-Шень)
 Steklo (1997) (Glass, Стекло)
 Pit Electrichestvo (1998) (To Drink Electricity, Пить Электричество)
 The Best (compilation) (1998)
 Egiptyanin (2001) (Egyptian, Египтянин)
 Fioletovo-Cherny (2001) (compilation) (Violet and Black, Фиолетово-черный)
 Nastoyashchiye Dni 1982–1992 (compilation) (2002) (Actual Days, Настоящие Дни)
 Smutniye Dni 1992–2002 (compilation) (2002) (Days Obscure, Смутные Дни)
 Chuzhoy (2002)(Alien, Чужой)
 Govorit i Pokazyvayet (2003) (Tells and Shows, Говорит и показывает)
 Tribute (Piknik songs performed by other artists) (2003) (Трибьют)
 Ten Vampira (with Vadim Samoylov from Agatha Christie) (2004) (Shadow of Vampire, Тень Вампира)
 Korolevstvo Krivykh (2005) (Kingdom of the Crooked, Королевство Кривых)
 Novoyegipetskiye Pesni (remixes of old songs) (2005) (New-Egyptian Songs, Новоегипетские Песни)
 Mrakobesiye i Dzhazz (2007) (Obscurantism and Jazz, Мракобесие и Джаз)
 Zhelezniye Mantry (2008) (Iron Mantras, Железные мантры)
 Teatr Absurda (2010) (Theatre of Absurd, Театр абсурда)
 Tri Sudby (2011) (The Three Fates, Три судьбы)
 Pevets Dekadansa (2012) (The Chanter of Decadence, Певец Декаданса)
 Chuzhestranets (2014) (Stranger, Чужестранец)
 Iskri i Kankan (2017) (Sparks and Cancan, Искры и канкан)
 Siyaniye (2019) (Shine, Сияние)

References

External links
  (Russian)
 Shklarskiy's cite (Russian)
 Piknik lyrics interpretations and quotes from Shklarskiy interviews (Russian)
 Band info (English)
 English lyrics (English)
 Piknik songs translations
 The song "Under a star" (from the "Ginseng" album (English)
 The song "And they taught me how to fly" (from the "Wolf's Dance" album)
 The song "Fetish" (from the "Theatre of Absurd" album)
 The song "Werewolf" (from the "Shadow of Vampire" album)

Musical groups from Saint Petersburg
Soviet rock music groups
Russian rock music groups
Russian progressive rock groups